Paulina Uścinowicz (born 16 October 1999) is a Polish handball player for Borussia Dortmund Handball and the Polish national team.

She represented Poland at the 2020 European Women's Handball Championship.

References

External links
 

1999 births
Living people
Polish female handball players
Sportspeople from Gdańsk
Expatriate handball players
Polish expatriate sportspeople in Denmark
Polish expatriate sportspeople in France
21st-century Polish women